The 1981–82 South-West Indian Ocean cyclone season was destructive and deadly in Madagascar, where four cyclones killed 100 people and caused $250 million (USD) in damage. The season was fairly active, lasting from October to May. There were nine named storms that attained gale-force winds, or at least . Five of the storms attained tropical cyclone status, which have 10-minute sustained winds of at least .

The first storm was Tropical Cyclone Alex, which was named by the Australian Bureau of Meteorology (BoM). this was due to the boundary of the basin at the time, which incorporated the Indian Ocean south of the equator and extended from the east coast of Africa to 80° E; the eastern extent was later moved to 90° E. Two other storms – Armelle and Damia – also originated in the Australian basin. The first storm to affect Madagascar was Benedicte in December, and was followed by tropical storms Frida and Electre in February and Justine in March.

Season summary 
Météo-France's meteorological office at Réunion (MFR) issued advisories for storms in the basin during the year. At the time, the MFR area of warning responsibility was from the coast of Africa to 80° E, and the agency primarily used the Dvorak technique to estimate the intensities of tropical cyclones. The nine tropical storms and five tropical cyclones was identical to the long-term average from 1981 to 2011.

The Joint Typhoon Warning Center (JTWC), which is a joint United States Navy – United States Air Force task force that issues tropical cyclone warnings for the region, also issued advisories for storms in the year. The agency tracked a tropical depression in July 1982. The system formed on July 4 southeast of Seychelles, and initially curved to the southwest. At the time, the annual tropical cyclone year was from August 1 to July 31 of the subsequent year.

Four storms struck Madagascar in the season between December and March, collectively killing 100 people and causing $250 million (1982 United States dollars) in damage. The storms caused widespread flooding and a state of disaster for four months, compounded by floods in January. About 180,000 people were forced to evacuate, and there were increased levels of flood-related diseases. The storms closed down many roads and destroyed widespread crops, forcing the government to import 400,000 metric tons of rice. After the floods, workers repaired damaged roads and dykes while the government provided relief supplies. However, the ongoing floods strained the Madagascar's resources, and the government appealed for aid to the international community on February 4. The United States Agency for International Development provided nearly $9 million in aid, mostly for rice and rebuilding roads. Other countries donated about $7.5 million in money or relief goods, such as building materials, food, clothing, and medicine.

Systems

Tropical Cyclone Alex 

While still in the Southern Hemisphere spring, the Intertropical Convergence Zone (ITCZ) was active across the southern Indian Ocean in the middle of October. On October 18, a low-pressure area formed, based on reports from nearby ships. It moved southeastward and slowly intensified, given the name Alex. Located southwest of Sumatra, the storm curved to the south. For several days, it maintained much of its intensity while curving to the southwest. The storm eventually weakened due to strong wind shear deteriorating the convection. On October 27, Alex dissipated.

The storm developed east of 80° E but west of 90° E, which at the time was part of the warning responsibility for the Australian Bureau of Meteorology (BoM). However, the MFR expanded its area of responsibility to 90° E in 1985.

Severe Tropical Storm Bessi–Armelle 

On November 1, an area of convection formed southwest of Sumatra just south of the equator. It moved southwestward and slowly developed a distinct low-pressure area. During this time, the storm moved generally west-southwestward, crossing 80° E on November 11; at that time, the Mauritius Meteorology Service renamed it Armelle. The storm continued westward and gradually weakened. On November 18, Armell deteriorated to tropical depression status, dissipating two days later between Tromelin Island and the Seychelles.

Tropical Cyclone Benedicte 

In the middle of December, the ITCZ was active across the southern Indian Ocean, northeast of Madagascar. A circulation developed on December 16, which preceded the development of a tropical disturbance on December 17. Moving to the west-northwest, the system slowly developed before shifting to the southwest. On December 19, the system intensified into a moderate tropical storm while passing 75 km (45 mi) north of Madagascar. After briefly developing an eye feature, the satellite presentation degraded due to land interaction. Convection increased as the storm progressed through the Mozambique Channel, and the Madagascar Meteorological Service named it Benedicte on December 20. The organization improved over the next few days as the eye feature became better defined. That day, the storm turned westward toward the Mozambique coast, weakening as it approached land. Benedicte made landfall on central Mozambique on December 24 and turned northward, straddling the border with Malawi. The storm dissipated on the next day, with only a remnant area of clouds present on satellite imagery by December 26.

Antsiranana also reported . The storm damaged thousands of homes and wrecked much of the region's coffee and pepper crops. Benedicte killed 13 people and was the first in a succession of six storms that flooded the country.

Tropical Depression Clarissee 

Toward the end of December, strong convection persisted southeast of Diego Garcia. These storms consolidated into a distinct center on December 29, warranting its classification as a tropical depression. For several days the system meandered – it moved northward on December 30 due to a ridge to the south, although soon thereafter turned back to the south and later to the west. Due to a Dvorak rating of 2.5, the Mauritius Meteorology Service named the system Clarisse. Clarisse dissipated on January 7 about 500 km (310 mi) east of St. Brandon.

Intense Tropical Cyclone Chris–Damia 

A low-pressure area developed on January 5 near Christmas Island in the Australian basin. Moving westward due to a large anticyclone to the south, it gradually intensified and was named Chris by the BoM. The storm developed an eye on January 9, and that day crossed 90° E into the south-west Indian Ocean. On January 11, the Mauritius Meteorology Service renamed the storm as Damia. Damia turned southwestward and slowly weakened; by January 16, the cyclone weakened to tropical storm status, although it reintensified into a tropical cyclone the next day. Around that time, the storm passed about 20 km (12 mi) north of Rodrigues and later approached Mauritius before curving to the south. As a weakened tropical storm, Damia later curved more to the southeast and dissipated on January 23.

The storm damaged or destroyed 70 houses, forcing 500 people to shelters, while 100 km (60 mi) of unpaved roads were wrecked. Power, telephone, and water access was disrupted. Damia heavily damaged the island's agriculture, with 25% of the corn crop destroyed. Several fishing boats were wrecked, and 15% of forest areas were damaged. Monetary damage was estimated at $650,000 (USD), which prompted the government to request international aid for rebuilding.

Moderate Tropical Storm Electre 

The ITCZ became active toward the end of January from the coast of Madagascar to Diego Garcia, spawning a distinct circulation on January 31 southeast of Tromelin Island, which became a tropical disturbance. Due to a trough, the system moved west-southwestward toward Madagascar. On February 1, the system was named Electre as it gradually intensified. Electre weakened as it crossed the country and emerged into the Mozambique Channel on February 4 south of Maintirano. The storm re-intensified to its former peak intensity as it turned west-northwest. On February 5, Electre made its final landfall on central Mozambique between Lumbo and Quelimane, dissipating soon thereafter.

Electre caused flooding and landslides, particularly in the area around Lake Alaotra. The storm damaged all roads from eastern Madagascar to the capital city Antananarivo, as well as the rail connecting the city with Toamasina. There were 13 deaths in the country.

Moderate Tropical Storm Frida 

Tropical Storm Frida developed on January 31 over east-central Madagascar, between Fianarantsoa and Mahanoro. It moved offshore and turned to the south. On February 1, the storm intensified to peak winds of  before turning westward and moving back ashore, steered by a ridge. As the storm moved through the former Fianarantsoa Province, it dropped rainfall that flooded and isolated several towns. The floods washed away bridges and knocked down power lines.

Moderate Tropical Storm Gabrielle 

On February 5, a tropical disturbance formed north of St. Brandon, and quickly intensified into Tropical Storm Gabrielle by the next day. The storm continued to the southwest without much change in intensity, weakening slightly on February 9. That day, Gabrielle turned to the west-northwest and executed a tight loop before progressing southward. After turning to the southeast, the storm dissipated on February 11.

Tropical Cyclone Justine 

The ITCZ became active in the middle of March northeast of Madagascar, which spawned two low-pressure areas on March 15. The westernmost became a tropical disturbance on the next day between Madagascar and Tromelin. It quickly intensified while tracking to the southwest and was named Justine on March 17. On March 18, the storm intensified into tropical cyclone status and developed a well-defined eye. At 15:00 UTC that day, Justine moved ashore northeastern Madagascar near Sambava. It continued southwestward and weakened over the island, emerging into the Mozambique Channel near Besalampy as a tropical storm. That day, a ridge over southern Africa steered Justine to the southeast away from land, although the ridge weakened and allowed the storm to move back to the west-southwest. It weakened to a tropical storm during this time. The storm turned again to the southeast on March 24 after the ridge moved to the east. Justine passed north of Europa Island before striking Madagascar again early on March 25 just north of Toliara. It became extratropical over land, and soon again reached open waters while turning to the south. Justine dissipated on March 27 within the flow of the westerlies.

The storm was the final in a series of storms affecting the country, damaging coastal towns in the northeast and southwest. Justine damaged houses, crops, and roads, while destroying a vanilla storage shed in Sambava. While the storm was changing its trajectory offshore Mozambique, the Commandant Bourdais ship attempted to avoid the storm, only to sail through  gusts and  waves, which flooded the deck and damaged a gangway. Later, Justine passed near Europa island, producing  waves.

Intense Tropical Cyclone Karla 

A low pressure persisted toward the end of April between Diego Garcia and the equator. It developed a spiral area of convection on April 24, which preceded the development of a tropical disturbance the next day. By that time, the system was already at tropical storm status and was given the name Karla. Moving southwest, the storm strengthened and organized. A ridge to the south steered Karla to the east on April 27, although an approaching trough turned it to the southeast on the following day. Enhanced atmospheric instability helped the storm strengthen to tropical cyclone status on April 29. On the next day, Karla attained peak winds of  after developing a well-defined eye. Increased wind shear and progressively cooler waters weakened the cyclone as it turned more to the south. By May 3, the storm weakened to tropical depression status and dissipated the next day within the westerlies.

Other systems 

A tropical depression formed south of Diego Garcia on February 12. Given the name Heberte, it moved southward initially, reaching winds of only . A ridge to the south turned the system back north, and Heberte dissipated on February 14 near where it formed.

There were three short-lived tropical depressions toward the end of February. The first formed on February 19 about 350 km (220 mi) northeast of Tromelin Island. It moved southward toward Mauritius, bringing several days of heavy rainfall there and Réunion. The depression turned to the west-northwest and dissipated on February 23. That day, the other two depressions formed, including one between Réunion and Madagascar. Given the name Isabeau, it moved westward and dissipated on February 24, reaching winds of only . The other depression originated in the Mozambique Channel off the southwest coast of Madagascar. It gradually became extratropical, dissipating within the westerlies on February 26.

See also 
 Atlantic hurricane seasons: 1981, 1982
 Eastern Pacific hurricane seasons: 1981, 1982
 Western Pacific typhoon seasons: 1981, 1982
 North Indian Ocean cyclone seasons: 1981, 1982

References 

 
South-West Indian Ocean cyclone seasons
1981–82 Southern Hemisphere tropical cyclone season
Tropical cyclones in 1981
Tropical cyclones in 1982